"Where have you been for eight years?", "Where have you been for the last eight years?", or "Why have you been silent during the past eight years?" is a loaded question widely used in the disinformation campaign in the context of the 2022 Russian invasion of Ukraine in support of Russia, mainly pointing out to what Ukraine has been "doing" to Donbas during the war in Donbas (2014–2022), and that the Russo-Ukrainian War has been ongoing since the 2014 Russian annexation of Crimea. It has been described as Russian pro-war propaganda.

Phrase variations

Putin's "On conducting a special military operation" speech

Russian president Vladimir Putin's televised address on 24 February 2022 referenced the eight years that had passed since 2014 multiple times.

Russian nationalists started using this phrase as their response to the "#НетВойне" ("No to war") hashtag, accusing anti-war protesters of having no concern for Russian-speaking people in the Donbas region of Ukraine.

According to social anthropologist Alexandra Arkhipova, this argument is so common in Russian culture because it is much easier to point out the actions of an enemy instead of one's own actions, denying any form of guilt. It is also part of "whataboutism", which was a common tactic in Soviet propaganda, similar to "And you are lynching Negroes".

Responses
Ukrainian journalist and TV presenter Kateryna Osadcha said that "Russia has been tearing Ukraine apart for eight years".

On 3 March 2022, Pavlo Kanygin, a Russian journalist, wrote his responses for the "where have you been for eight years" questions, which also explained more about the separatists in Donbas.

War in Donbas

More than 3,000 civilians were killed as a result of the war in Donbas (2014–2022), but there is no evidence to support the claim that Ukraine committed the genocide of Russian-speaking people or ethnic Russians in Ukraine. Before Russia began its full-scale invasion of Ukraine in 2022, the intensity of the hostilities in the Donbas had been steadily declining since the signing of the Minsk agreements in February 2015. For example, according to Ukrainian authorities, 50 Ukrainian soldiers were killed in clashes with Donbas separatists in 2020.

See also

 Russian irredentism
 Rashism
 Russian nationalism
 Propaganda in Russia
 Disinformation in the 2022 Russian invasion of Ukraine
 Media portrayal of the Russo-Ukrainian War

Notes

References

2022 Russian invasion of Ukraine in popular culture
Internet memes introduced from Russia
Phrases
Political Internet memes
Russian political phrases
Russo-Ukrainian War
Propaganda in Russia related to the 2022 Russian invasion of Ukraine
Disinformation in the 2022 Russian invasion of Ukraine
Internet memes related to the 2022 Russian invasion of Ukraine